Quite Contrary is the seventh studio album, ninth album overall, by American queercore band Pansy Division, it was released on September 9, 2016 by Alternative Tentacles.

Features cover models Marcus Ewert and Moon Trent.

Track listing

Personnel
Pansy Division
Jon Ginoli – guitar, vocals
Chris Freeman – bass, vocals
Luis Illades – drums, percussion
Joel Reader – lead guitar, vocals

2016 albums
Pansy Division albums